Robert Edwin Hall  (14 January 1961 – 11 May 1996) was a New Zealand mountaineer. He was the head guide of a 1996 Mount Everest expedition during which he, a fellow guide, and two clients died. A best-selling account of the expedition was given in Jon Krakauer's Into Thin Air, and the expedition has been dramatised in the 2015 film Everest. At the time of his death, Hall had just completed his fifth ascent to the summit of Everest, more at that time than any other non-Sherpa mountaineer.

Hall met his future wife, physician Jan Arnold, during his Everest summit attempt in 1990. Hall and Arnold climbed Denali for their first date and later married. In 1993, Hall and Arnold climbed to the summit of Everest together. In the catastrophic 1996 season, Arnold would have accompanied Hall on his Everest expedition, but she was pregnant.

Mountaineering

Hall grew up in New Zealand where he climbed extensively in the Southern Alps. In 1989, Rob Hall met Gary Ball, who became his climbing partner and close friend. As with most other mountain climbers, Hall and Gary Ball sought corporate sponsorships to fund their expeditions. The partners decided to climb the Seven Summits, but upped the ante by ascending to the summits of all seven in seven months. They started with Everest in May, and climbed the last mountain, Antarctica's Vinson Massif, on 12 December 1990, hours before the deadline. After this success they realised that to retain their sponsorships, each successive climb would have to be ever riskier and more spectacular, increasing the chances of an accident. Hall and Ball therefore decided to quit professional climbing and form a high-altitude guiding business.

Their company, Adventure Consultants, was incorporated in 1992 and quickly became a premier expedition guiding company. That year they guided six clients to the top of Everest. In October 1993, Gary Ball died of pulmonary edema, leaving Hall to run Adventure Consultants on his own. By 1996, Hall had guided thirty-nine climbers up to the top of Everest. Although the price of a guided summit attempt – US$65,000 – was considerably higher than that of other expeditions, Hall's reputation for reliability and safety attracted clients from all over the world. Rob Hall was well known in the mountaineering world as the "mountain goat" or the "show".

In the 1994 Queen's Birthday Honours, Hall was appointed a Member of the Order of the British Empire, for services to mountaineering.

1996 Everest disaster

Adventure Consultants' 1996 Everest expedition consisted of eight clients and three guides (Hall, Mike Groom and Andy Harris). Among the clients was Jon Krakauer, a journalist on assignment from Outside magazine. Hall had brokered a deal with Outside; he would guide one of their writers to the summit in exchange for advertising space and a story about the growing popularity of commercial expeditions to Everest.

Shortly after midnight on 10 May 1996, the Adventure Consultants expedition began a summit attempt from Camp IV, atop the South Col. They were joined by climbers from Scott Fischer's Mountain Madness company, as well as expeditions sponsored by the governments of Taiwan and India.

The expeditions quickly encountered delays. Upon reaching the Hillary Step, the climbers discovered that no fixed line had been placed, and they were forced to wait for an hour while the guides installed the ropes (Rob nonetheless "fixed most of the mountain in 1996"). Since some 33 climbers were attempting to reach the summit on the same day, and Hall and Fischer had asked their climbers to stay within 150 m of each other, there were bottlenecks at the single fixed line at the Hillary Step. Many of the climbers had not yet reached the summit by 2:00 pm, the last safe time to turn around to reach Camp IV before nightfall.

Hall's Sardar, Ang Dorje Sherpa, and other climbing Sherpas waited at the summit for the clients. Near 3:00 pm, they began their descent. On the way down, Ang Dorje encountered client Doug Hansen above the Hillary Step, and ordered him to descend. Hansen refused. When Hall arrived at the scene, he sent the Sherpas down to assist the other clients, and stated that he would remain to help Hansen, who had run out of supplementary oxygen.

At 5:00 pm, a blizzard struck the Southwest Face of Everest, diminishing visibility and obliterating the trail back to Camp IV. Shortly afterward, Hall radioed for help, saying that Hansen had fallen unconscious but was still alive. Adventure Consultants guide Andy Harris began climbing to the Hillary Step at 5:30 pm with water and supplementary oxygen.

On 11 May, at 4:43 am, close to twelve hours after the blizzard had started, Hall radioed down and said that he was on the South Summit. He reported that Harris had reached the two men, but that Hansen had died sometime during the night and that Harris was missing as well. Hall was not breathing bottled oxygen, because his regulator was too choked with ice. By 9:00 am, Hall had fixed his oxygen mask, but indicated that his frostbitten hands and feet were making it difficult to traverse the fixed ropes. Later in the afternoon, he radioed to Base Camp, asking them to call his wife, Jan Arnold, on the satellite phone. During this last communication, he reassured her that he was reasonably comfortable and told her, "Sleep well my sweetheart. Please don't worry too much." He died shortly thereafter. His body was found on 23 May by mountaineers from the IMAX expedition, and still remains just below the South Summit. In the 1999 New Zealand bravery awards, Hall was posthumously awarded the New Zealand Bravery Star for his actions.

Media coverage
Jon Krakauer published an article in Outside and a book called Into Thin Air shortly after the disaster. In both, he speculated that the delays caused by the fixed ropes, as well as the guides' decision not to enforce the 2:00 pm turnaround time, were responsible for the deaths. Krakauer was criticised by Hall's widow for publishing their last conversation. Hall's radio transmission from the summit ridge was patched through and connected to his wife at home. The transcription of Hall's final conversation with his wife was reprinted in the book.
Into Thin Air: Death on Everest, a TV movie on the 1996 Everest disaster, starred Nathaniel Parker as Rob Hall.
The series Seconds From Disaster published an episode about the 1996 incident called "Into The Death Zone". Rob Hall's ordeal is heavily covered in the episode.
The Neil Finn song "The Climber" was inspired by Rob Hall's death.
Another documentary directed by David Breashears, who was on Everest in 1996, "Storm Over Everest" aired on the PBS program Frontline in 2008.
A feature film based on the events titled Everest (2015) was developed by Working Title Films and Universal Pictures, and directed by Baltasar Kormákur. Rob Hall is portrayed by Jason Clarke.
Rob Hall is a character in the opera Everest (2015) by British composer Joby Talbot, which follows the major episodes of the 1996 Mount Everest disaster.
The Anjan Dutt song "Mr. Hall" from the album Keu Gaan Gaye is based on Rob Hall's legacy.

List of major climbs
 1990 – Seven Summits (the Bass list: Aconcagua, Mount Everest, Elbrus, Kilimanjaro, Denali, Kosciuszko, Vinson)
 1992 – K2 attempt (Scott Fischer, Ed Viesturs, and Charley Mace helped Hall save his climbing partner Gary Ball from edema)
 1992 – Mount Everest
 1993 – Dhaulagiri (reached 7300m with Gary Ball and Veikka Gustafsson. Veikka and Rob tried to rescue Gary, who got edema and later died on mountain.)
 1993 – Mount Everest (with his wife, Jan Arnold)
 1994 – Mount Everest
 1994 – Lhotse
 1994 – K2
 1994 – Cho Oyu
 1994 – Makalu
 1995 – Cho Oyu
 1996 – Mount Everest (died on descent)

See also
List of 20th-century summiters of Mount Everest
List of people who died climbing Mount Everest

References

External links
 Rob Hall Biography EverestHistory.com
 Rob Hall Biography
 Rob Hall Biography at 7summits.com
 Adventure Consultants
 2013: Portrait Painting of Rob Hall

1961 births
1996 deaths
Mountaineering deaths on Mount Everest
New Zealand Members of the Order of the British Empire
New Zealand mountain climbers
Summiters of the Seven Summits
Recipients of the New Zealand Bravery Star
Mountain guides